Hans Sprenger (born 12 October 1948) is a retired German footballer.

Sprenger made his Fußball-Bundesliga debut on 24 August 1974 for Tennis Borussia Berlin in a 5–0 away loss to Eintracht Braunschweig. He went on to make 145 appearances in total for TeBe, 52 of which were in the Bundesliga.

References

External links 
 

1948 births
Living people
German footballers
Association football defenders
Bundesliga players
2. Bundesliga players
Tennis Borussia Berlin players
Wacker 04 Berlin players